The Centre for Disease Control and Prevention was created in 2001 and is under the Health Bureau of Secretariat for Social Affairs and Culture of Macau, China.

History
In the wake of the COVID-19 pandemic in Macau, the CPDCP's Communicable Disease Prevention and Disease Surveillance Unit is tasked to monitor residents of Macau and anyone else who travels in and out of the SAR as part of anti-coronavirus measures enacted.

Structure
The CDCP is in of the following units:

 Communicable Disease Prevention and Disease Surveillance Unit
 Special Preventive Services Team
 Chronic Disease Prevention and Health Promotion Unit
 Environmental & Food Hygiene Unit
 Health Planning Unit
 Vector Control Working Group
 Community Health Working Group

See also 
 Similar agencies
 Centre for Health Protection, Hong Kong
 Chinese Center for Disease Control and Prevention
 European Centre for Disease Prevention and Control (ECDC) 
 Centres for Disease Control (CDC) 
 Health Protection Agency (HPA) 
 Institut de veille sanitaire (IVS) 
 Public Health Agency of Canada (PHAC) 
 Public health

References

Government departments and agencies of Macau